Agnolo is an Italian masculine given name, ancient Tuscan form of Angelo. Angiolo is also another Tuscan variant of the same given name.

Agnolo may refer to:
 Agnolo Aniello Fiore (15th century), Italian sculptor
 Agnolo di Baccio d'Agnolo (16th century), Italian architect
 Agnolo di Tura (14th century), Italian chronicler
 Agnolo Firenzuola (–1545), Italian poet
 Agnolo Gaddi (–1396), Italian painter
 Agnolo Pandolfini (1360–1446), Renaissance humanist
 Agnolo Poliziano (1454–1494), Italian poet

See also
 Agnolo (disambiguation)

Italian masculine given names